IFR is instrument flight rules, rules for when flight by outside visual reference is not safe.

IFR may also refer to:
 Infection fatality rate in epidemiology
 Ideal final result, an engineering design goal
 In-flight refueling
 Institute of Food Research, an agricultural and food science research institution
 Integral fast reactor, a nuclear reactor design
 International Federation of Robotics
International Financing Review, a financial magazine
 International Fleet Review, various publications of the same name
 Instantaneous wave-free ratio (iFR), a diagnostic medical test used in coronary artery stenosis assessment